Nicholas Logan (July 18, 1896 – April 1975) was an American Negro league pitcher in the 1920s.

A native of Buckingham County, Virginia, Logan made his Negro leagues debut in 1921 for the Baltimore Black Sox, and played three seasons with Baltimore. He died in Wayne, Pennsylvania in 1975 at age 78.

References

External links
 and Baseball-Reference Black Baseball stats and Seamheads

1896 births
1975 deaths
Date of death missing
Baltimore Black Sox players
Baseball pitchers
Baseball players from Virginia
People from Buckingham County, Virginia
20th-century African-American sportspeople